Osmo Heikki Kristian Soininvaara (born 2 September 1951 in Helsinki) is a Finnish politician and writer, former party leader and cabinet member.

Personal life 

Soininvaara has a licentiate degree in statistics. Before his political career he worked as a statistician. 

Soininvaara is married to Anna-Maria Soininvaara and they have three children: Ohto (born 1990), Ilppo (born 1991), and Helmi (born 1997).

Political life 

Soininvaara was elected in Helsinki city council in 1985 and has served in various positions of trust in the city administration since then. He was elected in Eduskunta in 1987 and again in 1995 and was a member of parliament until 2007, when he chose not to stand for re-election. After a break he was elected to the parliament again in 2011, serving until 2015.

He served as Minister of Social Services in Paavo Lipponen's second cabinet between 14 April 2000 and 19 April 2002. He was the leader of the Finnish Green League party from 2001 to 2005.

Basic income proposal 
Soininvaara is a long-time advocate of a basic income and has published several books and reports on this topic. In Hyvinvointivaltion eloonjäämisoppi, awarded as the best economics book of 1994, he proposed a detailed basic income scheme differentiated for household composition.

See also
 Universal basic income in the Nordic countries

References

External links 
 The official website of Osmo Soininvaara
 Is Finland ready for a basic income?. Helsinki Times. Published 17 July 2014.

1951 births
Living people
Politicians from Helsinki
Green League politicians
Ministers of Social Affairs of Finland
Members of the Parliament of Finland (1987–91)
Members of the Parliament of Finland (1995–99)
Members of the Parliament of Finland (1999–2003)
Members of the Parliament of Finland (2003–07)
Members of the Parliament of Finland (2011–15)
Universal basic income activists
Universal basic income writers
Finnish bloggers